Sir Kenneth Joseph Jackson (born 3 March 1937) was the General Secretary of the Amalgamated Engineering and Electrical Union (AEEU) from 1995 until that union's merger with the Manufacturing Science and Finance (MSF) union to form Amicus in 2001. He subsequently became one of the Joint General Secretaries (JGS) of Amicus.

Jackson was born and educated in Wigan, Lancashire. He joined the Royal Air Force in 1956 as an electrical technician, and continued in the same profession after re-entering civilian life. In 1966, he was elected as a Branch Secretary in the Electrical Trades Union, later the Electrical, Electronic, Telecommunications and Plumbing Union (EETPU). He became an executive councillor of EETPU in 1987 and its president in 1992. In 1995, following EETPU's incorporation into the AEEU, he became AEEU General Secretary.

Following the merger of AEEU and the Manufacturing, Science and Finance Union (MSF) to form Amicus, Jackson automatically assumed the role of Joint General Secretary of the AEEU Section of Amicus. This position came up for re-election in June 2002 and he was defeated by the then relatively unknown Derek Simpson, who went on to become Amicus General Secretary.

Throughout his career, Jackson was on the right wing of the union movement. He was a vice-president of the Trade Union Committee for European and Transatlantic Understanding (TUCETU), an organisation with close links to NATO and the CIA. He became a close associate of Labour's then-prime minister Tony Blair, often being described as "Tony Blair's favourite trade unionist", and received a knighthood in 1999, an unusual honour for a trade union leader. His defeat in 2002 occurred at a time when the trade union movement was moving to the left: he found himself at odds with his counterparts in the movement due to his support of issues such as private-public partnerships and US aggression. Six union officials had admitted to attempting to rig the election nominating process, but Jackson denied any involvement.

Jackson became chairman of Nirex, a company which manages disposal of nuclear waste, in December 2001, while he was still a JGS of Amicus.

References

External links

 Guardian biography
 Union official quits in rigged ballot row – The Independent (UK), 12 June 2002

1937 births
Living people
General Secretaries of Amicus
General Secretaries of the Amalgamated Engineering and Electrical Union
Presidents of the Amalgamated Engineering and Electrical Union
Knights Bachelor
People from Wigan